Rocky IV is a 1985 American sports drama film written, directed by, and starring Sylvester Stallone. The film is the sequel to Rocky III (1982) and the fourth installment in the Rocky film series. It also stars Talia Shire, Burt Young, Carl Weathers, Tony Burton, Brigitte Nielsen, and Dolph Lundgren. In the film, Rocky Balboa (Stallone) fights Ivan Drago (Lundgren), a Soviet boxer responsible for causing tragedy in Balboa's life. 

Development for a fourth Rocky film began soon after the success of Rocky III, which faced controversy after it was subject to a copyright lawsuit. Principal photography began in 1984, with filming locations including Philadelphia, Wyoming, and Vancouver. Rocky IV was Lundgren's American film debut, and Stallone's last directorial effort until 2006; they engaged in authentic punching in their fight scenes, which led to Stallone being admitted to intensive care. Filming also featured new special effects and bona fide and groundbreaking sport methods and equipment, some of which were years removed from public use. Rocky IV is known for its strong Cold War themes, and for its successful theme songs "Burning Heart" and "Living in America".

Rocky IV premiered in Los Angeles on November 21, 1985, and was theatrically released in the United States by MGM/UA on November 27. The film received mixed reviews, with criticism for its predictable screenplay and praise for Drago's credibility as a villain. Scholars note that Drago's ultimate defeat and the Soviet crowd's embrace of Rocky represented the crumbling of the Soviet Union, while others criticize the film as propaganda through its Cold War themes and negative portrayals of Russians. 

The film was a box office success, grossing $300 million worldwide, becoming the highest grossing film in the franchise and the third highest grossing film of 1985 domestically and the second highest grossing film worldwide. Critical reception of the film became more favorable in the years later, with praise for the training montages. The film has been considered an icon of 1980s pop culture. In 2021, a director's cut was released with the title Rocky IV: Rocky vs Drago, receiving positive reviews from critics. The sequel, Rocky V, was released in 1990.

Plot 

In 1985, Soviet boxer Ivan Drago arrives in the United States with his wife, Ludmilla, a Soviet swimmer, and a team of trainers from the Soviet Union and Cuba. His manager, Nicolai Koloff, takes every opportunity to promote Drago's athleticism as a hallmark of Soviet superiority. Motivated by patriotism and an innate desire to prove himself, former heavyweight champion Apollo Creed challenges Drago to an exhibition bout. Rocky has reservations but agrees to help train Apollo for the match.

During a press conference regarding the match, hostility sparks between Apollo's and Drago's respective camps. The boxing exhibition takes place at the MGM Grand Hotel in Las Vegas. Apollo enters the ring in an over-the-top patriotic entrance with James Brown performing "Living in America" complete with showgirls. The bout starts tamely with Apollo landing several punches that are ineffective against Drago, but Drago suddenly retaliates with devastating effects. By the end of the first round, Rocky and Apollo's trainer, Duke, plead with him to stop the match, but Apollo refuses to do so and tells Rocky to not stop the match "no matter what." Drago continues to pummel him in the second round and Duke begs Rocky to throw in the towel. Rocky honors Apollo's wishes, which allows Drago to beat Apollo to death in the ring. In the aftermath, Drago displays no sense of contrition, commenting to the assembled media: "If he dies, he dies."

Frustrated by the Soviets' cold indifference, Rocky decides to challenge Drago himself, but has to surrender his championship to do so. Drago's camp agrees to an unsanctioned 15-round fight in the Soviet Union on Christmas Day, an arrangement meant to protect Drago from the threats of violence he has been receiving in the United States. Rocky travels to the Soviet Union without his wife Adrian due to her disapproval of the match, setting up his training base in a remote cabin in Krasnogourbinsk with only Duke and Paulie to accompany him. Duke opens up to Rocky, stating that he actually raised Apollo and that his death felt like a father losing his son, and expresses his faith in Rocky that he will emerge victorious. To prepare for the match, Drago uses high-tech equipment, a team of trainers and doctors monitoring his every movement, and regular doses of anabolic steroids. Rocky, on the other hand, does roadwork in deep snow over mountainous terrain and workouts utilizing antiquated farm equipment. Adrian arrives unexpectedly to give Rocky her support, which gives Rocky a new vigor.

Before the match begins, Balboa is the first to enter to a hostile crowd. As he waits nervously in the ring, the lights in the arena suddenly go out, and Drago is introduced with an elaborate patriotic ceremony, with the Soviet general secretary and the Politburo in attendance. The home crowd is squarely on Drago's side and hostile to Rocky. In contrast to his match with Apollo, Drago immediately goes on the offensive. Rocky takes a fierce pounding in the first round, but goes on the offensive toward the end of the second round after landing a brutal right hook that cuts Drago's left eye, stunning both Drago and the crowd. Duke encourages Rocky by reminding him that he just proved Drago is a man, and not a machine as he's been made out to be. In contrast, Drago comments to his trainers that Rocky "is not human, he is like a piece of iron," after his trainers reprimand him for his performance against the "weak" American.

The two boxers spend the next dozen rounds trading blows, with Rocky managing to continually hold his ground despite Drago's best efforts. As the 12th round begins, the previously hostile Soviet crowd suddenly start chanting and cheering for Balboa. After being berated by Koloff, Drago rebels, throwing him from the ring and directly addressing the Soviet leadership, stating he fights only for himself. In the final round, with both fighters exhausted, Rocky initially takes more punishment, but manages to stay on his feet. Both fighters trade blows, before Balboa seizes an opening, unleashing a series of vicious blows, eventually knocking out Drago and avenging Apollo's death.

Rocky gives a victory speech, acknowledging that the local crowd's disdain of him had turned to mutual respect during the fight. Rocky finally declares: "During this fight, I've seen a lot of changing, the way you felt about me, and in the way I felt about you. In here, there were two guys killing each other, but I guess that's better than 20 million. I guess what I'm trying to say, is that if I can change, and you can change, everybody can change!" The Soviet premier stands up and reluctantly applauds Rocky, and his aides follow suit. Rocky ends his speech by wishing his son watching the match on TV a Merry Christmas and raises his arms into the air in victory as the crowd applauds.

Cast
 
 Sylvester Stallone as Robert "Rocky" Balboa, "The Italian Stallion": The reigning two-time Heavyweight Champion of the World.
 Talia Shire as Adrian Balboa: Rocky's wife and support through his boxing career.
 Burt Young as Paulie Pennino: Rocky's friend and brother-in-law.
 Carl Weathers as Apollo Creed: Former Heavyweight Champion of the World, and close friend to Rocky.
 Brigitte Nielsen as Ludmilla Vobet Drago: Wife and supporter of Ivan Drago, and Olympic swimming champion. In real-life, Nielsen was engaged to Stallone during the production, and married shortly after the release. They appeared together once again in 1986's Cobra, before they divorced in 1987.
 Dolph Lundgren as Captain Ivan Drago: the Soviets' prize Champion boxer "The Siberian Express" and a Soviet Army infantry captain
 Tony Burton as Tony "Duke" Evers: Apollo's father-figure, friend, trainer and manager, who becomes Rocky's trainer for his match against Drago.
 Michael Pataki as Nicolai Koloff: Trainer, promoter, and manager of Ivan Drago.
 Rocky Krakoff as Rocky Jr.
 David Lloyd Austin as Mikhail Gorbachev (uncredited)
 George Rogan as Sergei Rimsky: Another Drago trainer
 Sylvia Meals as Mary Anne Creed: Wife of Apollo

LeRoy Neiman plays the ring announcer in the Creed-Drago match. Burgess Meredith appears as Mickey Goldmill in archive footage. Appearing as themselves are singer James Brown and commentators Stu Nahan, Warner Wolf, R. J. Adams, Barry Tompkins and Al Bandiero.

Production

Casting
Sportscaster Stu Nahan makes his fourth appearance in the series as commentator for the Creed–Drago fight. Warner Wolf replaces Bill Baldwin, who died following filming for Rocky III, as co-commentator. For the fight between Rocky and Drago, commentators Barry Tompkins and Al Bandiero portray themselves as USA Network broadcasters.

Apollo Creed's wife Mary Anne (Sylvia Meals) made her second appearance in the series, the first being Rocky II, although the character was mainly featured in Rocky II. Stallone's future wife, Brigitte Nielsen, appeared as Drago's wife, Ludmilla.

The Soviet premier in the sky box during the Rocky–Drago match, played by David Lloyd Austin, strongly resembles contemporary (and last) Soviet leader Mikhail Gorbachev. Austin later played Gorbachev in The Naked Gun, and Russian characters in other films.

Filming
Wyoming doubled for the frozen expanse of Russia. The small farm where Rocky lived and trained was in Jackson Hole, and Grand Teton National Park was used for filming many of the outdoor sequences in the Soviet Union. The PNE Agrodome at Hastings Park in Vancouver, British Columbia served as the location of Rocky's Moscow bout.

Sylvester Stallone has stated that the original punching scenes filmed between him and Dolph Lundgren in the first portion of the fight are completely authentic. Stallone wanted to capture a realistic scene and Lundgren agreed that they would engage in legitimate sparring. One particularly forceful Lundgren punch to Stallone's chest slammed his heart against his breastbone, causing the heart to swell. Stallone, suffering from labored breathing and a blood pressure over 200, was flown from the set in Canada to Saint John's Regional Medical Center in Santa Monica, and was forced into intensive care for eight days. Stallone later commented that he believed Lundgren had the athletic ability and talent to fight in the professional heavyweight division of boxing. Producer Winkler describes the exact same event in his autobiography, observing not Lundgren, rather, "Sly took a punch from a stand-in fighter and ended up in the emergency room with his blood pressure dangerously high."

Additionally, Stallone has stated that Lundgren nearly forced Carl Weathers to quit during the filming of the Apollo-vs.-Drago "exhibition" fight. At one point in the filming of the scene, Lundgren tossed Weathers into the corner of the boxing ring. Weathers shouted profanities at Lundgren while leaving the ring and announced that he was calling his agent and quitting the movie. Only after Stallone forced the two actors to reconcile did filming continue. The event caused a four-day work stoppage, while Weathers was talked back into the part and Lundgren agreed to tone down his aggressiveness.

Post-production
Rocky IV is one of the few sport movies that applies genuine sound effects from actual punches, bona fide training methods created by boxing consultants, and a bevy of other new special effects. The film is recognized as being ahead of its time in its demonstration of groundbreaking high-tech sporting equipment, some of which was experimental and 20 years from public use. In 2012, Olympians Michael Phelps and Ryan Lochte noted that the training sequences in Rocky IV inspired them to use a cabin similar to what the resourceful Balboa utilized in the film.

Paulie's robot, a character that through the years has enjoyed a cult following of its own, was created by International Robotics Inc. in New York City. The robot's initial voice was that of the company's CEO, Robert Doornick. The robot is identified by its engineers as "SICO" and is/was a member of the Screen Actors Guild. It toured with James Brown in the 1980s. The robot was written into the movie after it had been used to help treat Stallone's autistic son, Seargeoh.

Music

Soundtrack

The musical score for Rocky IV was composed by Vince DiCola, who would later compose the music for The Transformers: The Movie. Rocky IV is the only film in the series not to feature original music by Bill Conti, who was replaced by DiCola; however, it does feature arrangements of themes composed by Conti from previous films in the series, such as "The Final Bell". Conti, who was too busy with the first two Karate Kid films at the time, would return for Rocky V and Rocky Balboa. Conti's famous piece of music from the Rocky series, "Gonna Fly Now", does not appear at all in Rocky IV (the first time in the series this happened), though a few bars of it are incorporated into DiCola's training montage instrumental.

Songs from the movie included "Living in America", by James Brown, and also music by John Cafferty ("Heart's on Fire", featuring Vince DiCola), Survivor, Kenny Loggins, and Robert Tepper. Four of these songs became U.S. chart hits, two of which reached the Top Five.  Go West wrote "One Way Street" for the movie by request of Sylvester Stallone. Europe's hit "The Final Countdown", written earlier in the decade by lead singer Joey Tempest, is often incorrectly stated as being featured in the film due to its similarity to DiCola's "Training Montage." However, Europe's track was not released as a single until late 1986, after Rocky IV's release.

According to singer Peter Cetera, he originally wrote his best-selling solo single "Glory of Love" as the end title for this film, but was passed over by United Artists, and instead used the theme for The Karate Kid Part II.

Release

Theatrical
Rocky IV premiered in Westwood, Los Angeles on November 21, 1985. It opened Wednesday, November 27 on 1,325 screens in the United States and Canada prior to the Thanksgiving holiday.

Lawsuit
The script development was the subject of a famous copyright lawsuit, Anderson v. Stallone. Timothy Anderson developed a treatment for Rocky IV on spec; after the studio decided not to buy his treatment, he sued when the resulting movie script was similar to his treatment. The court held that Anderson had prepared an unauthorized derivative work of the characters Stallone had developed in Rocky I through III, and thus no part of his infringing work was eligible for copyright restriction.

Director's cut
In August 2020, Stallone announced that a director's cut edition of the film would be released to commemorate the film's 35th anniversary. Ongoing editing ultimately pushed the release date, with Stallone finishing his editing sometime in January 2021. In all, approximately 38 minutes of previously unreleased footage consisting of both new scenes and alternate takes was added to the film, including significant extensions of both fight scenes and the Apollo Creed funeral scene, in addition to a lengthier recap of Rocky III at the beginning of the film. Conversely, a significant amount of original footage was removed or replaced, as the director's cut runs 93 minutes compared to the original cut's 91 minutes.

One major cut was that of the scenes featuring Paulie's robot. "The robot is going to the junkyard forever, no more robot," Stallone commented. Robert Doornick, founder of International Robotics and the voice of the robot, commented that Stallone cut all of the robot scenes in the director's cut to save money on royalty fees that were given to Doornick in the original cut. Scenes with Brigitte Nielsen playing Ludmilla, Ivan Drago's wife, were also substantially diminished, particularly the scenes where she spoke for her husband at press conferences and her encounter with Apollo Creed's wife in Las Vegas just before the tragic fight between Creed and Drago. Nielsen and Stallone were married in 1985, shortly after the film's premiere, and divorced in 1987, which perhaps explains Stallone's decision to now reduce the role of his ex-wife in the film. In contrast, additional minor scenes featuring Adrian and Drago's manager Nicolai were added to the film.

Other scenes from the 1985 version removed in the new cut include Balboa celebrating his wedding anniversary with Adrian and the Soviet regime leaders applauding Rocky for his speech after winning the final fight. The director's cut also features the addition of some of Bill Conti's themes from the previous films onto the soundtrack, and the toning down of sound effects, particularly the exaggerated punching sounds heard in the original cut. The new cut is also presented in a new aspect ratio of 2.39:1 compared to the original's 1.85:1.

The cut missed its original November 27, 2020, release, though by February 2021 Stallone publicly stated that he was "putting the finishing touches" on the project. On April 6, 2021, he announced a completion of the cut. The director's cut, titled Rocky IV: Rocky vs. Drago - The Ultimate Director's Cut, had a one-night theatrical release on November 11, 2021, it was then released in digital formats the following day. A "making of" video was released on YouTube a week prior to the director's cut release.

Reception

Box office
Over the 5-day Thanksgiving weekend, it grossed a non-summer record $31,770,105. In its fourth week of release it expanded to a then-record 2,232 screens. It spent a total of six weeks as the number one film at the US box office, staying on top through the Christmas and New Years period, and grossed a total of $127.8 million in United States and Canada, and $300 million worldwide, the most of any Rocky film. It was the highest-grossing sports film of all time, until The Blind Side (2009), which grossed $309 million (without accounting for inflation). It was also the highest-grossing fourth installment of a film in the United States and Canada, surpassing the record of Sudden Impact (1983). Its success led to other studios opening major films over the Thanksgiving holiday.

In the United Kingdom it also had a record opening, grossing £1,780,894 in its first five days.

Stallone has been quoted as saying the enormous financial success and fan-following of Rocky IV once had him envisioning another Rocky movie, devoted to Drago and his post-boxing life, with Balboa's storyline running parallel to Drago's. However, he noted the damage both boxers sustained in the fight made them "incapable of reason", and thus instead planned Rocky V as a showcase of the dangers of boxing.

Critical response

Theatrical cut (1985) 
The film has a 37% approval rating on Rotten Tomatoes, from 49 critics, indicating mixed reviews; the critical consensus states, "Rocky IV inflates the action to absurd heights, but it ultimately rings hollow thanks to a story that hits the same basic beats as the first three entries in the franchise." On Metacritic, the film has a score of 40 out of 100, based on 13 critics, indicating "mixed or average reviews".

Roger Ebert gave the film two out of four stars, stating that with this film the Rocky series began "finally losing its legs. It's been a long run, one hit movie after another, but Rocky IV is a last gasp, a film so predictable that viewing it is like watching one of those old sitcoms where the characters never change and the same situations turn up again and again." Ian Nathan of Empire gave the film two out of five stars, calling the script a "laughable turd" and describing Rocky IV as "the [film] where the Rocky series threw in the towel on the credibility."

Gene Siskel of the Chicago Tribune gave the film a 3.5 out of 4 stars, and stated in his review, "[Stallone] creates credible villains worthy of his heroic character."

Director's cut (2021) 
The new cut received better reviews from critics, mainly praising the fights (new choreography and sound), more dramatic tone and character development, but still criticising the plot. On Rotten Tomatoes, the recut version, entitled Rocky IV: Rocky vs. Drago, holds an approval rating of 80% based on 15 reviews, with an average rating of 7.0/10.

Jeremy Smith, from Polygon, stated: "The triumph of Stallone’s director’s cut — with a pin-sharp focus on Apollo and Rocky’s relationship and its ruthless removal of anything which distracts — is that it not only nails the central message of the film, but the very point of it existing at all (montages aside)".

In his review for the Empire, Terri White praised the clearer motivations in the director's cut: "It's a much more sombre context for the film (and goes some way to recontextualising the first three outings) and serves to subdue its worst indulgences. Without the gills of excess breathing quite so hard, the story of Rocky then pledging to fight Drago in Russia on Christmas Day becomes clear: it's not about solving the Cold War or even a simple revenge yarn wrapped in bombastic patriotism. Rocky needs to find a way to break free of the code. To find a way to change. Apollo couldn't, it says now more explicitly, and he died because of it".

Accolades 
Dolph Lundgren received acclaim for his performance as Ivan Drago. He won the Marshall Trophy for Best Actor at the Napierville Cinema Festival. Rocky IV also won Germany's Golden Screen Award.

The film won five Golden Raspberry Awards, including Worst Actor (Sylvester Stallone, along with Rambo: First Blood Part II), Worst Director (Stallone), Worst Supporting Actress (Brigitte Nielsen), Worst New Star (Nielsen, and also for Red Sonja) and Worst Musical Score. It also received nominations for Worst Picture, Worst Supporting Actress (Talia Shire), Worst Supporting Actor (Burt Young) and Worst Screenplay.

Analysis
Scholars note that the film's strong yet formulaic structure emphasizes the power of the individual, embodied by Rocky, the prototypically American hero who is inventive, determined, and idealistic. 
They contrast that with Ivan Drago's hyperbolic characterization as a representation of Soviet power in the context of the latter part of the Cold War. Writer/director Stallone highlights the nationalistic overtones of the Balboa–Drago fight throughout the film, such as when Drago's wife claims the United States is filled with "threats of violence" to her husband. Drago's trainer comments that American society has become "pathetic and weak" and "antagonistic and violent" Drago represents the totalitarian regime, demonstrating his power when he topples an arrogant opponent (Creed). Later on, the radio announcer says, "Ivan Drago is a man with an entire country in his corner."

Reaction in Russia
Russia's state-run Russia Beyond published an article in 2021, detailing the trip of a Russian "goodwill ambassador" Katya Lycheva to America in the 1980s. In the article, it is claimed that she objected to the character Ivan Drago, saying that the film uses him to vilify the Russian people: "In the movie "Rocky IV" there is not a word of truth about the Soviet Union. We don't even have such faces." Russia Beyond quoted an alleged American journalist saying: "What this film can be blamed for is the constant and shameless pressure on the audience to treat the Russians and their government with contempt, pity and disgust". In 2020, Russia's Maxim magazine ranked the film 8th in the list of "12 most delusional films about Russia", noting that "cinema takes its grudge against the most unpleasant, pre-Gorbachev Soviet realities. […] Soviet sports and party apparatchiks are portrayed in the film with incredible poison and malice".

Other media

Sequel

A sequel titled Rocky V, was released in November 1990.

Novelization
A novelization was published by Ballantine Books in 1985. Sylvester Stallone was credited as the author. The novel included some backstory for Drago and his wife. Drago was a former coal miner who had come to the government's attention after being featured in a Party promotional film about mining. Ludmilla, born in Kiev to a Party official, had begun training to become a swimming Olympic champion when she was nine.

Video games
In 1987, Rocky was released, based on the first four Rocky films. 2002 saw the release of Rocky, based on the first five Rocky films. 2004 saw the release of Rocky Legends, also based on the first five Rocky films.

Creed II
Sylvester Stallone, Dolph Lundgren, and Brigitte Nielsen reprise their roles from Rocky IV in Creed II, the sequel to the 2015 film Creed. The plot involves Drago's son Viktor fighting Adonis Creed (Michael B. Jordan) for his title as a way of his father Ivan regaining some of the prestige he lost after his defeat in Rocky IV.

See also
 List of Christmas films

References

External links

 Official Rocky Anthology Site
 Dolph Lundgren Interview
 
 
 
 
 
 
 

1985 films
1980s English-language films
1980s Russian-language films
1980s sports drama films
American robot films
American sequel films
American sports drama films
American boxing films
Cold War films
American films about revenge
Films directed by Sylvester Stallone
Films produced by Robert Chartoff
Films produced by Irwin Winkler
Films scored by Vince DiCola
Films set in 1985
Films set in the Las Vegas Valley
Films set in Moscow
Films set in Philadelphia
Films set in Russia
Films set in the Soviet Union
Films set in the United States
Films shot in the Las Vegas Valley
Films shot in Los Angeles
Films shot in Vancouver
Films shot in Wyoming
Rocky (film series) films
Films with screenplays by Sylvester Stallone
United Artists films
1980s Christmas films
Cultural depictions of Mikhail Gorbachev
1985 drama films
Films about the Russian Mafia
Golden Raspberry Award winning films
1985 multilingual films
American multilingual films
1980s American films